Rinaldo Corso (died 1582) was a Roman Catholic prelate who served as Bishop of Strongoli (1579–1582).

Biography
On 3 August 1579, Rinaldo Corso was appointed by Pope Gregory XIII as Bishop of Strongoli.
He served as Bishop of Strongoli until his death in 1582.

See also
Catholic Church in Italy

References

External links and additional sources
 (for Chronology of Bishops) 
 (for Chronology of Bishops) 

16th-century Italian Roman Catholic bishops
1582 deaths
Bishops appointed by Pope Gregory XIII
Inquisitors of Malta